Gérard Bayo (born 20 July 1936, Bordeaux) is a French poet and writer. He was awarded the Prix Antonin-Artaud in 1977 for Un Printemps difficile.

He also translated the Romanian poets Ana Blandiana and Horia Bădescu, and has written several studies on Arthur Rimbaud.

Works
1956: Nostalgies pour paradis, ill. de Bernard Locca, Paris, Éditions , series "Paragraphes, 48 p. 
1961: L’Attente inconnue, drawings by Nicolas Damianakis,  Bordeaux, Les Nouveaux Cahiers de jeunesse, 32 p. 
1962: Le Pain de vie, Dijon, Éditions Georges Chambelland, 56 p. 
1971: Les Pommiers de Gardelegen, Paris, Librairie Saint-Germain-des-Prés, coll. "Le Pont de l’Épée", 72 p. 
1975: Un Printemps difficile, Paris, Éditions Georges Chambelland, coll. "Le Pont de l’Épée" 114 p. 
 - Prix Antonin-Artaud 1977, Grand prix Lucian Blaga 1991, Prix de l'Académie Mallarmé 2016.
1977: Didascalies, Saint-Laurent-du-Pont, Éditions Le Verbe et l’empreinte, 18 p. 
1980: Au sommet de la nuit, Librairie Saint-Germain-des-Prés, series "Poètes contemporains", 115 p. 
1984: Déjà l’aube d'un été, Librairie Saint-Germain-des-Prés, series "Poètes contemporains", 109 p. 
1985: Arthur Rimbaud & l’éveil des limbes, Troyes, Éditions Librairie Bleue, 95 p. 
1987: Arthur Rimbaud, Troyes, Éditions Librairie Bleue, 299 p. 
1989: Vies, Marseille, Éditions Sud, series "Poésie" , 99 p. 
1990: L’Œuvre inconnue de Rimbaud, Troyes, Éditions Librairie Bleue, 214 p. 
1994: Le mot qui manque, Amay, Belgium, Les éditions l’Arbre à Paroles, 72 p. BRB n°722214
1995: Omphalos, Amay, Les éditions l’Arbre à Paroles, 68 p. BRB n°808019
1995: La Révolte d’Arthur Rimbaud, Troyes, Éditions Librairie Bleue, series "Essais", 294 p. 
2003: Pierre du Seuil, Amay, Les éditions l’Arbre à Paroles, 103 p. BRB n°1420840
2006: KM 340, Saint-Pierre-la-Vieille, France, Atelier La Feugraie, series "L’Allure du chemin", 74 p. 
2007: L’Autre Rimbaud, Rimbach, Germany, Éditions En Forêt, 364 p. 
2010: Chemins vers la terre, Châtelineau, Belgium, Éditions Le Taillis Pré, 
2012: La Gare de Voncq, Amay, Les éditions l’Arbre à Paroles, 68 p. 
2013: La Langue des signes, Paris, Éditions L’Herbe qui tremble, 75 p. 
2014: Un Printemps difficile, watercolors by Marie Alloy, Éditions L’Herbe qui tremble, 214 p. 
2014: Sous cet arbre et dans la rue, Laon, France, Éditions La Porte, series "Poésie en voyage", 18 p. 
2015: « Neige » followed by « Vivante étoile » on Éditions L’Herbe qui tremble 161 p.
 - Prix Mallarmé 2016

External links
 Lectures de Gérard Bayo
 Gérard Bayo on Phoenix
 Gérard Bayo on L'Herbe qui tremble
 Gérard Bayo on Le Printemps des poètes
 Le Prix Mallarmé 2016 à Gérard Bayo, pour Neige, followed by Vivante étoile
 « Neige » followed by « Vivante étoile »
 Gérard Bayo on Book.fr

20th-century French male writers
20th-century French poets
21st-century French poets
21st-century French male writers
20th-century French essayists
21st-century French essayists
Writers from Bordeaux
1936 births
Living people
French male non-fiction writers